Everton Luiz Guimarães Bilher (born 24 May 1988), commonly known as Everton Luiz, is a Brazilian professional footballer who plays as a defensive midfielder for Belgian club Beveren. He is primarily recognized for his aggressive and hard-tackling style of play.

After starting out in his homeland, mainly playing in the lower leagues, Everton Luiz moved to Europe in 2013. He went on to play for Swiss clubs Lugano and St. Gallen, before transferring to Serbian club Partizan in early 2016. In his first full season with the Crno-beli, Everton Luiz collected the double.

In early 2018, Everton Luiz moved to Italy to join Serie A club SPAL. He was sent out on loan to Major League Soccer team Real Salt Lake a year later, before signing a permanent deal with them ahead of the 2020 season.

Career

Early years

Born in Porto Alegre, Everton Luiz started out at his home state club Brasil de Farroupilha. He subsequently went to Caxias do Sul, before switching to Náutico. In 2007, Everton Luiz signed with Ponte Preta, eventually finishing his formation in the club's youth setup. He made his senior debut for the club in the Campeonato Paulista, before signing with Palmeiras in April 2009, on a four-year deal. In February 2010, Everton Luiz was loaned to Marília, representing the club in the second level of the São Paulo state league. He also played for Marília in the Campeonato Brasileiro Série C, making seven appearances and scoring once.

In 2011, after playing for Palmeiras' B team, Everton Luiz had a brief spell with Bragantino, but failed to make any appearances. He eventually signed with CRB in early 2012. Immediately upon arrival, Everton Luiz became one of the club's key players, helping CRB win the Campeonato Alagoano. He was also named in the competition's team of the year. In June 2012, Everton Luiz joined Mexican club San Luis. He made 10 appearances in the Torneo Apertura, before leaving the club. In January 2013, Everton Luiz was loaned to Criciúma. He subsequently returned to CRB in March 2013. After returning from loan, Everton Luiz helped his team win another Alagoas state league title, being named in the competition's best eleven for the second year in a row.

Lugano and St. Gallen
In the summer of 2013, Everton Luiz moved to Swiss club Lugano. He made his official debut for the club in a 2–1 home league win over Wil on 13 July 2013. In the following fixture, Everton Luiz scored his first goal for Lugano, netting the opener in his team's 4–2 away victory over Schaffhausen. He scored a total of three goals from 28 appearances in the Swiss Challenge League, as the club finished in second place.

In June 2014, Everton Luiz switched to St. Gallen, penning a three-year deal. After initially playing for their reserve team in the Swiss Promotion League, Everton Luiz made his Swiss Super League debut on 24 September 2014, playing the full 90 minutes in a 3–0 victory over Grasshoppers, eventually becoming a regular member of the first team. He collected 24 league appearances in the 2014–15 season, receiving two red cards in the process.

Partizan

2015–16 season
On 6 January 2016, Everton Luiz was transferred to Serbian club Partizan. He signed a two-and-a-half-year contract and was given the number 25 shirt. On 27 February, Everton Luiz made his official debut for the club in a 2–1 home loss in the Belgrade derby, receiving a yellow card early into the match. He sustained a knee injury in his second appearance for Partizan, a 1–0 away victory at Radnički Niš, which eventually kept him out of action for more than a month. On 10 April, Everton Luiz returned to the pitch in a 4–0 home league win over Mladost Lučani, playing the whole game. He netted his first goal for the club in his second Belgrade derby on 16 April, scoring an injury-time equalizer from more than 30 meters out through the goalkeeper's hands. After celebrating his goal, Everton Luiz was sent off for provoking the opponent's fans. He subsequently helped Partizan win the 2015–16 Serbian Cup, playing the full 90 minutes and earning a yellow card in the final match, a 2–0 win over Javor Ivanjica.

2016–17 season
In July 2016, Everton Luiz recorded his debuts in UEFA competitions, playing the full 90 minutes in two goalless draws against Zagłębie Lubin in the 2016–17 UEFA Europa League second qualifying round, as Partizan were eliminated after a penalty shoot-out. He scored his first goal of the season in a 3–0 away league victory over Voždovac on 15 October. In his first full campaign with Partizan, Everton Luiz helped the club win the double. He was also named in the league's best eleven due to his solid performances in the process.

2017–18 season

In late May 2017, following a successful season for Partizan, the club's director of football Ivica Iliev confirmed that Everton Luiz would be offered a new deal. However, no agreement was reached and the player entered the final year of his contract.

On 20 September 2017, Everton Luiz scored an injury-time goal to give Partizan a 1–1 draw versus Napredak Kruševac. He also appeared in all six of his team's games in the Europa League, as the side reached the knockout stage after 13 years.

SPAL
On 19 January 2018, Everton Luiz officially joined Italian club SPAL, penning a deal until the summer of 2020 with an option for another year. He made his Serie A debut on 10 February 2018, playing the first 55 minutes in an eventual 4–0 home loss to Milan. By the end of the season, Everton Luiz appeared in 10 more league games, helping the side avoid relegation.

Real Salt Lake
In January 2019, Everton Luiz was loaned to Major League Soccer club Real Salt Lake until the end of the year with an option to buy.

In December 2019, Real Salt Lake exercised their option to buy Everton Luiz ahead of the 2020 season.

Return to Europe
In July 2022, Everton Luiz was transferred to Belgian club Beveren.

Career statistics

Honours
CRB
 Campeonato Alagoano: 2012, 2013
Partizan
 Serbian SuperLiga: 2016–17
 Serbian Cup: 2015–16, 2016–17
Individual
 Campeonato Alagoano Team of the Year: 2012, 2013
 Serbian SuperLiga Team of the Season: 2016–17

References

External links
 
 
 
 

Associação Atlética Ponte Preta players
Association football midfielders
Brazilian expatriate footballers
Brazilian expatriate sportspeople in Belgium
Brazilian expatriate sportspeople in Italy
Brazilian expatriate sportspeople in Mexico
Brazilian expatriate sportspeople in Serbia
Brazilian expatriate sportspeople in Switzerland
Brazilian expatriate sportspeople in the United States
Brazilian footballers
Campeonato Brasileiro Série B players
Campeonato Brasileiro Série C players
Clube Atlético Bragantino players
Clube de Regatas Brasil players
Criciúma Esporte Clube players
Expatriate footballers in Belgium
Expatriate footballers in Italy
Expatriate footballers in Mexico
Expatriate footballers in Serbia
Expatriate footballers in Switzerland
Expatriate soccer players in the United States
FC Lugano players
FC St. Gallen players
FK Partizan players
Liga MX players
Major League Soccer players
Marília Atlético Clube players
Real Salt Lake players
San Luis F.C. players
Serbian SuperLiga players
Serie A players
S.K. Beveren players
Sociedade Esportiva Palmeiras players
S.P.A.L. players
Footballers from Porto Alegre
Swiss Challenge League players
Swiss Super League players
1988 births
Living people